First Time Felon is a 1997 drama film starring Omar Epps.

Plot
A young inexperienced drug dealer and Vice Lords gang member, Greg Yance (Omar Epps), is arrested for drug possession in his hometown, Chicago. Because of Yance having five grams of drugs under his belt at the time of arrest, he is facing a five-year prison sentence with no parole for drug trafficking. Because it is his first offense, he is offered an alternate sentence of 120 days in an intensive boot camp.

Throughout the boot camp, an experienced drill sergeant, Sergeant Calhoun (Delroy Lindo), continues pressuring Yance to follow through with the camp. Sergeant Calhoun's brutal methods breed resentment in Yance and other inmates.

Cast
Omar Epps as Greg Yance
Delroy Lindo as Calhoun
Lucinda Jenney as Sharon
Rachel Ticotin as McBride
William Forsythe as Sorley
Jo D. Jonz as Pookie
Treach as Tyrone
Pepa as Laverne
Justin Pierce as Eddie
Gary Anthony Williams as Wallace
Badja Djola as Disciple Leader
Robin Michelle McClamb as Greg's Mother (credited as Robin Vaughn)
Tom Nowicki as Hogan
Kristen Jones as Crystal
Ed Grady as Johnny the Farmer
Deborah Hobart as Annie Hill
Johnell Gainey as Nine
K. Addison Young as Wolf
Roger Ranney as Guardsman Jones
Charles S. Dutton as Inmate
Clifton Powell as King

Filming Details
Filmed in Green Cove Springs, Florida.
Filmed also in Cincinnati Ohio and Jacksonville Florida

See also 
 List of hood films

References

External links

1997 films
1997 drama films
HBO Films films
American films based on actual events
Films about real people
Films directed by Charles S. Dutton
Films set in Chicago
Films set in Illinois
Hood films
1997 directorial debut films
American drama television films
1990s English-language films
1990s American films